The Lübeck Museum of Theatre Puppets (in German: TheaterFigurenMuseum Lübeck) is a museum of international puppetry in the Hanseatic city of Lübeck, Germany.

Collection

Fritz Fey Jr's private TheaterFigurenMuseum Lübeck is located on a narrow street called Kolk situated close to the Holstentor and below the brick Gothic St. Peter's church in the medieval city centre of Lübeck. 

For decades Fey has collected anything related to the history of puppeteering in Germany and abroad and has exhibited part of his collection in this museum which comprises five medieval brick houses. It can well compete with the internationally renowned corresponding collections of the Münchener Stadtmuseum in Munich or the Dresdner Puppenmuseum in Dresden and is a widely acknowledged enrichment of Lübeck's museum scene, sponsored above all by the City of Lübeck and a private charitable foundation, the Possehl-Stiftung.

The museum contains some thousand exhibits from three centuries and three continents (Europe, Africa and Asia). They demonstrate that puppeteers have always and everywhere tried to hold a mirror up to their societies. The puppets they have used are technically quite different: glove puppets, marionettes, rod- and finger puppets, shadow puppets, ventriloquist's dummies, mechanical puppets, five-in-one puppets: all these puppets are represented in this museum.

The stars of the museum are the imaginative shadow puppets from Indonesia (Wayang), "Moto Rafael, the Electric Drawer", the "Dog Clown" that was used in scenes with real dogs, or the technically sophisticated "metamorphoses" - to name but a few.

In addition to the great variety of puppets the museum displays posters, props, scenery, costumes, musical instruments and even entire puppet theaters, i. e, all the attributes of high-quality puppeteering.

By means of a museum quiz youths and their parents can playfully dive into the world of puppeteers. In the video room a short documentary shows puppet plays from all over the world.

The museum has a shop and a café in which the visitors can relax among old marionettes and illustrations of gruesome and moralising ballads formerly recited by street singers.

Publications 
 TheaterFigurenMuseum Lübeck / Figurentheater Lübeck / UNIMA Deutschland, Fundsache:  KRAMER - entdeckt, erkundet, entwickelt, Theaterfiguren im Kolk - Band 1: Sonderausstellung - Filmnacht - Symposium, Puppen & Masken, Frankfurt 2012, 
 TheaterFigurenMuseum Lübeck /  UNIMA Deutschland, Im Reich der Schatten - Chinesisches Schattentheater trifft Peking-Oper, Theaterfiguren im Kolk - Band 2: Katalog zur Sonderausstellung, Puppen & Masken, Frankfurt 2012,

References
 Urbschat, K. (text) and Fritz Fey jun. (photos), 1999. Historische Theater-Figuren, Museum für Puppentheater Lübeck, Sammlung Fritz Fey jun. Lübeck: DrägerDruck.

External links

Official website

Puppet museums
Museums in Schleswig-Holstein
Culture in Lübeck
Buildings and structures in Lübeck
Puppetry in Germany